Beware! is the self-produced thirteenth studio album by R&B singer Barry White, released in November 1981, and the fourth release on his own CBS-affiliated custom label, Unlimited Gold. Peaking at #40 on the R&B chart, it fared better than his previous duet album with his wife which had failed to chart at all. It was preceded by the first single, a cover of Richard Berry's "Louie Louie", originally recorded in 1955. White performed it on Soul Train on September 19, 1981, but it failed to chart. The second single, the title track of the album, was also a cover version from the 1950's, originally written by Jo Ann Belvin for her husband Jesse Belvin shortly before they were both killed in a motor accident in 1960. "Beware" reached #49 on the R&B charts. As with his previous album, White's UK label refused to release any singles off the album.

Track listing 

 "Beware" (Jo Ann Belvin) - 5:50
 "Relax To The Max" (Barry White, Lowrell Simon) - 3:42
 "Let Me In And Let's Begin With Love" (Barry White, Vella M. Cameron) - 6:02
 "Your Love, Your Love" (Barry White, Lowrell Simon) - 4:22
 "Tell Me Who Do You Love" (Barry White, Darnell White) - 2:06
 "Rio De Janeiro" (Barry White, Carol P. Jackson, Marlon Jackson) - 4:25
 "You're My High" (Barry White, Nathan East) - 2:14
 "Oooo...Ahhh..." (Barry White, Fleming Williams, Jakki Miligan) - 3:58
 "I Won't Settle Less Than The Best (For You Baby)" (Barry White, Vella M. Cameron) - 4:20
 "Louie Louie" (Richard Berry) - 7:14

Singles

References 

1981 albums
Barry White albums